John Edmonstone of that Ilk (died c. 1410), was a Scottish nobleman.

Life
John was the eldest son of John Edmonstone of Boyne. He fought at the Battle of Otterburn in 1388, in which Scottish forces defeated the English forces of Henry Percy and his brother Ralph Percy, with the Percy brothers and many other English nobles taken prisoner. As part of the dowry of his wife, he received the village of Ednam.

Family and issue
John married Lady Isabel, the widow of James Douglas, 2nd Earl of Douglas, who was the daughter of King Robert II of Scotland and Elizabeth Mure. They are known to have had two sons:
 David Edmonstone, oldest son and heir.
 Sir William Edmonstone of Culloden and Duntreath, first of Duntreath.

Citations

References

14th-century births
1410s deaths
14th-century Scottish people
15th-century Scottish people
Scottish soldiers